In decision theory, on making decisions under uncertainty—should information about the best course of action arrive after taking a fixed decision—the human emotional response of regret is often experienced, and can be measured as the value of difference between a made decision and the optimal decision. 

The theory of regret aversion or anticipated regret proposes that when facing a decision, individuals might anticipate regret and thus incorporate in their choice their desire to eliminate or reduce this possibility. Regret is a negative emotion with a powerful social and reputational component, and is central to how humans learn from experience and to the human psychology of risk aversion. Conscious anticipation of regret creates a feedback loop that transcends regret from the emotional realm—often modeled as mere human behavior—into the realm of the rational choice behavior that is modeled in decision theory.

Description
Regret theory is a model in theoretical economics simultaneously developed in 1982 by Graham Loomes and Robert Sugden, David E. Bell, and Peter C. Fishburn.  Regret theory models  choice under uncertainty taking into account the effect of anticipated regret. Subsequently, several other authors improved upon it.

It incorporates a regret term in the utility function which depends negatively on the realized outcome and positively on the best alternative outcome given the uncertainty resolution. This regret term is usually an increasing, continuous and non-negative function subtracted to the traditional utility index. These type of preferences always violate transitivity in the traditional sense, although most satisfy a weaker version.

Evidence

Several experiments over both incentivized and hypothetical choices attest to the magnitude of this effect.

Experiments in first price auctions show that by manipulating the feedback the participants expect to receive, significant differences in the average bids are observed. In particular, "Loser's regret" can be induced by revealing the winning bid to all participants in the auction, and thus revealing to the losers whether they would have been able to make a profit and how much could it have been (a participant that has a valuation of $50, bids $30 and finds out the winning bid was $35 will also learn that he or she could have earned as much as $15 by bidding anything over $35.) This in turn allows for the possibility of regret and if bidders correctly anticipate this, they would tend to bid higher than in the case where no feedback on the winning bid is provided in order to decrease the possibility of regret.

In decisions over lotteries, experiments also provide supporting evidence of anticipated regret. As in the case of first price auctions, differences in feedback over the resolution of the uncertainty can cause the possibility of regret and if this is anticipated, it may induce different preferences.
For example, when faced with a choice between $40 with certainty and a coin toss that pays $100 if the outcome is guessed correctly and $0 otherwise, not only does the certain payment alternative minimizes the risk but  also the possibility of regret, since typically the coin will not be tossed (and thus the uncertainty not resolved) while if the coin toss is chosen, the outcome that pays $0 will induce regret. If the coin is tossed regardless of the chosen alternative, then the alternative payoff will always be known and then there is no choice that will eliminate the possibility of regret.

Anticipated regret versus experienced regret 
Anticipated regret tends to be overestimated for both choices and actions over which people perceive themselves to be responsible. People are particularly likely to overestimate the regret they will feel when missing a desired outcome by a narrow margin. In one study, commuters predicted they would experience greater regret if they missed a train by 1 minute more than missing a train by 5 minutes, for example, but commuters who actually missed their train by 1 or 5 minutes experienced (equal and) lower amounts of regret. Commuters appeared to overestimate the regret they would feel when missing the train by a narrow margin, because they tended to underestimate the extent to which they would attribute missing the train to external causes (e.g., missing their wallet or spending less time in the shower).

Applications

Besides the traditional setting of choices over lotteries, regret aversion has been proposed as an explanation for the typically observed overbidding in first price auctions, and the disposition effect, among others.

Minimax regret
The minimax regret approach is to minimize the worst-case regret, originally presented by Leonard Savage in 1951. The aim of this is to perform as closely as possible to the optimal course. Since the minimax criterion applied here is to the regret (difference or ratio of the payoffs) rather than to the payoff itself, it is not as pessimistic as the ordinary minimax approach. Similar approaches have been used in a variety of areas such as:
 Hypothesis testing
 Prediction
 Economics

One benefit of minimax (as opposed to expected regret) is that it is independent of the probabilities of the various outcomes: thus if regret can be accurately computed, one can reliably use minimax regret. However, probabilities of outcomes are hard to estimate.

This differs from the standard minimax approach in that it uses differences or ratios between outcomes, and thus requires interval or ratio measurements, as well as ordinal measurements (ranking), as in standard minimax.

Example
Suppose an investor has to choose between investing in stocks, bonds or the money market, and the total return depends on what happens to interest rates. The following table shows some possible returns:

The crude maximin choice based on returns would be to invest in the money market, ensuring a return of at least 1. However, if interest rates fell then the regret associated with this choice would be large. This would be 11, which is the difference between the 12 which could have been received if the outcome had been known in advance and the 1 received. A mixed portfolio of about 11.1% in stocks and 88.9% in the money market would have ensured a return of at least 2.22; but, if interest rates fell, there would be a regret of about 9.78.

The regret table for this example, constructed by subtracting actual returns from best returns, is as follows:

Therefore, using a minimax choice based on regret, the best course would be to invest in bonds, ensuring a regret of no worse than 5. A mixed investment portfolio would do even better: 61.1% invested in stocks, and 38.9% in the money market would produce a regret no worse than about 4.28.

Example: Linear estimation setting
What follows is an illustration of how the concept of regret can be used to design a linear estimator. 
In this example, the problem is to construct a linear estimator of a finite-dimensional parameter vector  from its noisy linear measurement with known noise covariance structure. The unknown parameter vector is known to lie in an ellipsoid  centered at zero. The regret is defined to be the difference between the MSE of the linear estimator that doesn't know the parameter , and the MSE of the linear estimator that knows . Also, since the estimator is restricted to be linear, the zero MSE cannot be achieved in the latter case. In this case, the solution of a convex optimization problem gives the optimal, minimax regret-minimizing linear estimator, which can be seen by the following argument.

According to the assumptions, the observed vector  and the unknown deterministic parameter vector  are tied by the linear model

Let

The MSE of this estimator is given by

Since the MSE depends explicitly on  it cannot be minimized directly. Instead, the concept of regret can be used in order to define a linear estimator with good MSE performance. To define the regret here, consider a linear estimator that knows the value of the parameter , i.e., the matrix  can explicitly depend on :

Then, using the Matrix Inversion Lemma

Substituting this  back into , one gets

This is the smallest MSE achievable with a linear estimate that knows . In practice this MSE cannot be achieved, but it serves as a bound on the optimal MSE.

The minimax regret approach here is to minimize the worst-case regret, i.e., 
 
This will allow a performance as close as possible to the best achievable performance in the worst case of the parameter . Although this problem appears difficult, it is an instance of convex optimization and in particular a numerical solution can be efficiently calculated. Similar ideas can be used when  is random with uncertainty in the covariance matrix.

See also
 Competitive regret
 Decision theory
 Info-gap decision theory
 Loss function
 Minimax
 Regret (emotion)
 Wald's maximin model

References

External links
 

Choice modelling
Optimal decisions
 Decision theory